Ionuț Cristian Hlinca (born 5 June 1988) is a Romanian professional footballer who plays as a defender for Liga IV side ACS Dumitra.

References

External links
 
 

1988 births
Living people
People from Bistrița-Năsăud County
Romanian footballers
Association football defenders
Liga I players
ACF Gloria Bistrița players
CS Gaz Metan Mediaș players
Liga II players
CS Sportul Snagov players
FC Brașov (1936) players
CS Luceafărul Oradea players
FC Olimpia Satu Mare players